Tembagapura is a district in Mimika Regency, part of the Indonesian province of Central Papua, centered on an urban village built to support the Grasberg Mine. The district covers 2,586.86 km2, and it had a population of 16,917 at the 2010 Census and 23,022 at the 2020 Census. 

The central town was established as a company town by Freeport-McMoran in the late 1960s.

Etymology
Tembaga in Indonesian means "copper", while pura in Sanskrit is equivalent to "temple" or "town", meaning "Copper Town".

Geography and climate
The town is in the Sudirman Range, not far from Mount Carstensz, the highest peak in Oceania. The weather is usually sunny in the morning, changing to cloudy and cool around noon.

Climate
Tembagapura has a subtropical highland climate (Cfb) with heavy rainfall year-round.

History
Construction of the mine and its infrastructure including the town, commenced in the late-1960s. Prior to this, the surrounding area had been inhabited by about 500 members of the Amung people living in traditional villages. However, as the settlement and the mine grew, migrants from other parts of Papua (e.g. the Dani people) and outside the island moved in, causing social tensions between the new arrivals and the locals. Popular unrest attributed to the Free Papua Movement and acts of violence against mining facilities occurred, resulting in relocations and reprisals by the Indonesian Army.

In 1981, Tembagapura was reported to house over 3,000 mine workers and their dependents. In 1994, biologist Tim Flannery visited the town and reported it to have a population of more than 10,000 people, with most of the amenities of a smaller urban community in the U.S. It had sports facilities, a club with a bar and restaurant, supermarkets and specialty shops, a bank, and excellent accommodations for workers and visitors. He observed that this was quite different from other locations in what was then called Irian Jaya.

Tembagapura has a school for English-speaking expatriate children that was called "the world's most remote international school." The town has a hospital, a community library, a full-sized outdoor soccer field, indoor tennis and squash courts and a state-of-the art gymnasium. The Lupa Lelah Club, a focal point for expatriates, includes a restaurant, a bar, and various function rooms. Shopping facilities included a coffee shop, Hero Supermarket (a well known Indonesian retail chain), Guardian Pharmacy, Hero Department Store, and a hairdresser.

Demographics
Tribal groups living near Tembagapura include the Ekari, Moni, Amungme and Dani people, who regard the land of the town and mine as belonging to their tribal lands, and not to the country of Indonesia. As a result, there is tension between the tribal peoples and the Indonesian Army, fueled and funded by the mining company. A security force, provided by the Indonesian Army, works to suppress the Indigenous inhabitants of the land.

See also
 Kuala Kencana, another district and company town built by Freeport-McMoRan in Mimika

References

External links
 Instagram photos tagged "Tembagapura"
 Flickr photos tagged "Tembagapura"
 Videos tagged "Tembagapura"
 Tembagapura web site
 Blog with posts by many former residents
 Population of Indonesia by Village

Mimika Regency
Mining towns in Indonesia
Planned townships in Indonesia
Populated places in Central Papua